Senator Stinson may refer to:

Bess Stinson (1902–1996), Arizona State Senate
William G. Stinson (born  1945), Pennsylvania State Senate